The 2014 season is Sandnes Ulf's 3rd season in the Tippeligaen, the top flight of Norwegian football and their ninth  season with Asle Andersen as their manager.

Squad

Transfers

Winter

In:

Out:

Summer

In:

 

Out:

Competitions

Tippeligaen

Results summary

Results by round

Results

Table

Norwegian Cup

Squad statistics

Appearances and goals

|-
|colspan="14"|Players away from Sandnes Ulf on loan:
|-
|colspan="14"|Players who appeared for Sandnes Ulf no longer at the club:

|}

Goal Scorers

Disciplinary record

References

External links
Sandnes Ulf's homepage
Gaukereiret supporterklubb - Sandnes Ulf Supporter's Club

2014
Norwegian football clubs 2014 season